Cyperus cyprius is a species of sedge that is native to parts of Cyprus.

See also 
 List of Cyperus species

References 

cyprius
Plants described in 1900
Flora of Cyprus